Emily Grove may refer to:

Emily Grove (athlete), American pole vaulter
Emily Grove (singer), American singer-songwriter and musician